Eser  may refer to:

 ESER, a German abbreviation for a Comecon computer standard
 Eser (name)
 Eser, an abbreviation (SR) commonly used in Russia around the times of the Russian Revolution for the members of Socialist-Revolutionary Party
A member of A Just Russia party, from the Russian-language initialism SR of the party name "Spravedlivaya Rossiya"
 Eser (company), an international construction company from Ankara, Turkey, active over the Middle East, Central Asia, East Europe and North Africa